In approximation theory, Jackson's inequality  is an inequality bounding the value of function's best approximation by algebraic or trigonometric polynomials in terms of the modulus of continuity or modulus of smoothness of the function or of its derivatives. Informally speaking, the smoother the function is, the better it can be approximated by polynomials.

Statement: trigonometric polynomials

For trigonometric polynomials, the following was proved by Dunham Jackson:

Theorem 1: If  is an  times differentiable periodic function such that

then, for every positive integer , there exists a trigonometric polynomial  of degree at most  such that

 

Jackson also proved the following generalisation of Theorem 1:

Theorem 2: One can find a trigonometric polynomial  of degree  such that

where  denotes the modulus of continuity of function  with the step 

An even more general result of four authors can be formulated as the following Jackson theorem. 

Theorem 3: For every natural number , if  is -periodic continuous function, there exists a trigonometric polynomial  of degree  such that

For  this result was proved by Dunham Jackson. Antoni Zygmund proved the inequality in the case when  in 1945. Naum Akhiezer proved the theorem in the case  in 1956. For  this result was established by Sergey Stechkin in 1967.

Further remarks

Generalisations and extensions are called Jackson-type theorems. A converse to Jackson's inequality is given by Bernstein's theorem. See also constructive function theory.

References

External links
 
 

Approximation theory
Inequalities
Theorems in approximation theory